Broderick is a village in the Canadian province of Saskatchewan within the Rural Municipality of Rudy No. 284 and Census Division No. 11.

History 
The post office was originally established under the name Chromar on December 1, 1907, but its name was changed to Broderick on January 1, 1909. Broderick incorporated as a village on September 13, 1909.

Demographics 

See also 

 List of communities in Saskatchewan
 Villages of Saskatchewan

References 

Villages in Saskatchewan
Rudy No. 284, Saskatchewan
Division No. 11, Saskatchewan